Trent O'Donnell (born 12 February 1976) is an Australian director, producer and screenwriter.

Life and career
O'Donnell is a television director and co-owner of the production company Jungle. He wrote and directed the award-winning comedy series Review with Myles Barlow – an Australian television satirical comedy series broadcast on the Australian Broadcasting Corporation (ABC) television station ABC1. It has won several AFI Awards for Best Comedy.
 
O'Donnell also directed the acclaimed The Chaser's War on Everything and the TV series Laid which all aired on ABC1.

In 2012 he wrote, produced and directed A Moody Christmas, a six-part drama series for the ABC TV.

In 2013 he was a writer and director for The Elegant Gentleman's Guide to Knife Fighting, a sketch comedy show for the ABC TV.

O'Donnell has also directed several short films, including Tiny Little Pieces, which was a finalist in the prestigious Tropfest Film Festival in 2002.

O'Donnell and Phil Lloyd, both from Jungle Entertainment, were awarded the Fred Parsons Award for Outstanding Contribution to Australian Comedy at the AWGIE Awards 2022.

Filmography

References

External links
 
 Jungleboys website
 Tropfest

1976 births
Australian television directors
Australian screenwriters
Living people
People from Sydney